Gloo (sometimes stylized in all caps as GLOO) is a British electronic music group composed of musicians Iglooghost, Kai Whiston, and BABii. The trio released their debut album, XYZ in 2019.

History
The trio are all musicians and frequent collaborators from the United Kingdom. Iglooghost and Whiston are long-time friends from Shaftesbury, although Whiston initially disliked Iglooghost's "faux-FlyLo beats." BABii hails from Margate, where she played a show together with Iglooghost. As the two familiarized themselves with each other, BABii gave vocal stems to Iglooghost and would feature on several tracks on his 2018 Clear Tamei and Steel Mogu EPs. BABii would meet Whiston at a festival. She also designed machines that gave fans rewards during an Iglooghost and Kai Whiston tour.

In 2018, Whiston described Gloo as an open and loosely-defined creative concept, telling Paper in an interview:
The definition is intentionally vague but it's not so much an imprint or label or distribution or anything. I guess you could say it's like an umbrella term that we use for things of product variety. Think like, Donda by Kanye but just fun creative shit. If Iglooghost decides he wants to build and sell furniture, he'll do it under GLOO. If I wanna sponsor a wrestling tournament, I'll do it under GLOO.

Whiston's 2018 album Kai Whiston Bitch was the first project to be made after Iglooghost and Whiston formally teamed up, and the trio formed in 2019. The group's sound has been described as diverse and frenetic; their music incorporates elements of grime, synth-pop, and bass, among other genres.

They released their first track, titled "Lamb", on 28 August 2019. On 18 September 2019, the group's debut studio album XYZ was released. The album received positive critical reception. Max Cussons of Contactmusic.com wrote that the album "saw the three bring out the best in each other across several future-fusion tracks, with Whiston bringing a lot of the muscle and spunk." In his 4.5 out of 5 star review of the album, Cussons called the group "three bright rays of hope in UK electronic music."

Discography

Studio albums

References

British musical trios
English electronic music groups
English experimental musical groups
Musical groups established in 2019
2019 establishments in the United Kingdom